Frederick William J. Palmer, CE, (1864–1947), known professionally as F. W. J. Palmer, was an English civil engineer, structural engineer and surveyor. From 1891 he was Surveyor to Herne Bay Urban District Council.  As Town Surveyor between at least 1891 and 1915 he was responsible for arranging the digging up of a great deal of Herne Bay. He organised the reconstruction of all the main roads, saw to the rebuilding of the council offices and Hampton Pier and led the construction of a new sea wall. He led the Sewerage of the East Cliff and nine miles of private roads at the east end of Herne Bay. He designed both phases (1904 and 1913) of the King's Hall, Herne Bay. His works helped to provide employment and to make the town what it is today. Archaeological artefacts turned up by his constant digging contributed to the collection now in Herne Bay Museum.

Career
He was articled to Alexander William Conquest (1848–1892), who was borough engineer and surveyor of Ramsgate and then of Folkestone, and who was the son of William Conquest, secretary to Joseph Bazalgette who created the London sewerage system. Palmer was then appointed assistant borough engineer and surveyor of Folkestone, remaining in that position until 1886, when he became assistant surveyor of the Vestry of the Parish (later Borough) of Fulham. In both positions he was working under A.W. Conquest. Subsequently, in 1891 he became the surveyor to Herne Bay Urban District Council, and remained there until at least 1915. He became a member of the Institution of Civil Engineers on 25 April 1896.

Works at Herne Bay

At Herne Bay between 1891 and 1915 (and probably longer) he carried out numerous fundamental engineering works. This involved excavating a large proportion of the town, and this cannot have gone unnoticed by the inhabitants. However, by virtue of his duties as Surveyor to the council, he contributed to a great extent in providing employment and in making the town what it is today. All this digging was certainly appreciated by the acquisitive antiquarian, Dr Tom Bowes, who subsequently donated stone tools, pottery and artefacts, found by workmen and builders, to the collection that was to become Herne Bay Museum and Gallery.

Palmer was involved in the complete reconstruction of all the main roads before Kent County Council took them over. He oversaw the entire renovation of Herne Bay's Town Hall, including the erection of a new gallery, and he directed the enlargement and construction of the Council Offices in Herne Bay High Street. Until at least the 1950s a local "concrete tomb" urban myth survived, suggesting that a construction worker had fallen into the poured concrete of Hampton Pier and was still there. During 1913 Palmer was responsible for the design and section-by-section construction of a new concrete sea wall. He also designed the Tower Lavatories on the sea front.

Works at East Cliff, Herne Bay
Palmer prepared a scheme for laying out, draining and scarping East Cliff, which cost £40,000, labour being supplied by the Central Unemployed Body For London. He "designed the scheme for sewering the whole of East Cliff including a 30-inch cast iron pipe sewer along the foot of the cliff and a 30-inch cast iron pipe up the face of the cliff."  He "designed and supervised the construction of the sea defence works at the foot of the East Cliff, reaching from the old boathouse site to practically the eastern boundary of the district; also the top promenade from Belle Vue Road to Sea View Road." He "made up and sewered nearly nine miles of private streets, under the Private Street Works Act" on the West Cliff and East Cliff.

The King's Hall, Herne Bay

This is a theatre, concert hall and dance hall, built as The Pavilion in 1903–1904 and developed as the King Edward VII Memorial Hall in 1913 in memory of the late king. Palmer designed both phases of the building.

1904 phase
In 1903 to 1904 Palmer planned and oversaw the building of the first phase of the Pavilion in his free time as a "labour of love." His plan consisted of a bandstand supported by a small building on a steep slope containing a tea room, rest rooms, a deckchair store and a small, covered auditorium (now the vestibule) to shelter 200 people and a band when it rained. There was no natural hollow ready and waiting. Upon this foundation the superstructure was erected." From a speech by F. W. J. Palmer at the opening of The Pavilion, 4 April 1904 The gracefulness of the building comes from the iron columns and ornamental ironwork manufactured to Palmer's design by MacFarlane & Co of Glasgow.

1913 phase
In 1911 to 1913 Palmer planned and oversaw the building of the second phase of the King's Hall. For this, he had to dig an even bigger hole in October 1912: "many thousands of yards of London Clay" were removed by his team to extend the building into the cliff. The 1904 phase remained as vestibule for the new Hall which was dug into the cliff at its back, or south side. The Hall was intended to accommodate 1,500 people inside, plus an audience of 1,100 above, for the rooftop bandstand. So inside the Hall there were large windows, ceiling roses doubling as natural ventilators, and two large louvred natural ventilators at the corners. The total cost for this phase was £6,000, the high price reflecting the excavation work and the new and fashionable use of ferro-concrete.

References

Bibliography

External links

1864 births
1947 deaths
People from Wimbledon, London
People from Herne Bay, Kent
British civil engineers
British structural engineers
British surveyors